Battle of Jenin may refer to:

 Capture of Jenin (1918), during World War I
 Battle of Jenin (1948), during the 1948 Arab–Israeli War
 Battle of Jenin (2002), during the Second Intifada